A Flower Bookmark is the first cover extended play by South Korean singer-songwriter IU. It is also her fourth Korean-language extended play. The EP was released on May 16, 2014, the singer's birthday, by LOEN Entertainment under its imprint LOEN Tree. Unlike her previous works, A Flower Bookmark features cover versions of nostalgic K-pop songs popularized from 1980s to 1990s.

The EP was successful both commercially and critically. It spawned two hit singles; the lead single "My Old Story" and "The Meaning of You". The former topped Billboard Korea K-Pop Hot 100, while the latter was ranked at the top of Gallup Korea's Song of the Year in 2014. In particular, the latter has gone to sell more than two million digital copies since release, even outselling the album's lead track. The EP also earned IU a MelOn Music Award for Artist of the Year, and a nomination for Album of the Year and was also listed at number three on Billboard'''s list of "Best K-Pop Albums of 2014".

A limited LP edition, featuring a bonus track "Eoheoya Dunggidunggi", was available for sale.

Background and releaseA Flower Bookmark consists of cover versions of nostalgic K-pop songs popularized from 1980s to 1990s, including "My Old Story" (Jo Deok-bae, 1985), "Flower" (Kim Kwang-seok, 1991), "Pierrot Smiles at Us" (Kim Wan-sun, 1990), "When Love Passes By" (Lee Moon-sae, 1987), "The Meaning of You" (Sanulrim, 1984), "Dreams in Summer Night" (Kim Hyun-sik, 1988), and "Boom Ladi Dadi" (Clon, 1996).

On May 15, a video teaser for A Flower Bookmark was uploaded on LOEN Entertainment's official YouTube channel. The teaser features Kim Wan-sun, the original singer of "Pierrot Smiles at Us". The official music video for the title track "My Old Story", starring actor Choi Woo-shik, was released via YouTube on the same day.

The whole album was released on the following day. After the album's release, "My Old Story" reached a perfect all-kill status.

Commercial performance
As of October 2015, the album has sold 53,900 copies in South Korea and 900 in Japan.

Critical reception

The album received critical acclaim upon release. The Korea Herald complimented the album for providing "a pleasant, calming respite from the mainstream music of today's times", and praised IU for her reinterpretations: "For every track, IU keeps a careful balance between preserving the song's original sentiments and altering the original with her own color and arrangements." Billboard highlighted the track, "Pierrot Smiles at Us", as the "most ambitious tune she tackled" and one that proved her diversity as a singer and called the album a "soothing mix of classic K-pop melodies". Furthermore, A Flower Bookmark was listed at number three on Billboards Best K-Pop Albums of 2014.

Track listing

Charts

Weekly charts

Monthly charts

Year-end charts

Single

"My Old Story '''"

Year-end charts

Accolades

Annual music awards

Use in media
 "The Meaning of You" was featured on SK Telecom's corporate advertisement.

Release history

See also
 List of Korea K-Pop Hot 100 number-one singles

Footnotes

References

External links
 IU's official website

2014 EPs
Covers EPs
IU (singer) EPs
Korean-language EPs
Kakao M EPs